The Bronx Zoo may refer to:

The Bronx Zoo, an urban zoo in New York City
 The Bronx Zoo (book), book about the New York Yankees by Sparky Lyle
 The Bronx Zoo (TV series), a short lived television series
 The Bronx Zoo (baseball), an era of the New York Yankees consisting of Reggie Jackson, Thurman Munson, Billy Martin, and George Steinbrenner
 A nickname for the original Yankee Stadium